

History
Besides the US Army wartime publication, there is no evidence this "light tank" or tankette existed. What is claimed in the US Army wartime publication to be the Type 93, is actually a later version of the Type 92 cavalry tank (tankette).

Combat history
None known.

References
Japanese tank and antitank warfare, published by U. S. Army military history institute, 1st of August, 1945, special series No. 34

Tankettes of Japan